Flashback Records is an independent record store and label in London.

Flashback Records may also refer to:

 Flashback Media Group, a Swedish media company
 Flashback Records (Bell), a 45 RPM/single oldies label and subsidiary of Bell Records and its successor Arista Records
 Rhino Flashback, a budget reissue label owned by Warner Music Group through Rhino Records